The 1943–44 Boston Bruins season was the Bruins' 20th season in the NHL.

Offseason

Regular season

Final standings

Record vs. opponents

Schedule and results

Playoffs
The Bruins failed to qualify for the playoffs.

Player statistics

Regular season
Scoring

Goaltending

Awards and records

Transactions

See also
1943–44 NHL season

References

Boston Bruins
Boston Bruins
Boston Bruins seasons
Boston Bruins
Boston Bruins
1940s in Boston